The University of Chicago sit-ins were a series of nonviolent protests at the University of Chicago in Chicago, Illinois in 1962. The protests were called to end alleged segregation in off-campus university owned residential properties.

Events

Dialogue

According to Chicago Maroon managing editor Avima Ruder, a staffer at the student paper found a copy of the University budget, and "we discovered that the University owned a lot of segregated apartment buildings...It was really bizarre because our student population at that point was largely white, but there was no segregation, there weren't separate dorms for African American students—if someone had suggested that, people would have been appalled."

Initially foregoing publishing the news, editors gave the apartment addresses to the Student Government, who reached out to the university chapter of the Congress of Racial Equality (CORE) to "conduct six test cases in which African American students attempted and failed to secure apartments in the segregated buildings." Student Government and CORE confronted President  George Beadle with their findings and demanded the buildings be desegregated. On January 17, 1962, the Maroon broke the story on the front page of the paper, with the headline, "UC Admits Housing Segregation." Beadle wrote a letter to the paper, agreeing that the university segregation was a problem, emphasized the University's nondiscrimination policy and the difference between on-campus housing, which was open to all, and commercial residential properties acquired by the University, many of which had existing segregation policies. "The only issue on which there is arguable difference of opinion," Beadle wrote, "is the rate at which it is possible to move toward the agreed objective without losing more than is gained."

Protests

Frustrated with Beadle's call for "planned, stable integration," CORE activists including Bernie Sanders led a rally at the University of Chicago administration building to protest university president George Beadle's segregated campus housing policy. "We feel it is an intolerable situation when Negro and white students of the university cannot live together in university-owned apartments," Sanders announced at the protest. Sanders and 32 other student activists marched into the building and camped out outside the president's office.

From January 23 to February 5, Sanders and the other civil rights protesters pressured Beadle and the university to form a commission to investigate discrimination. Beadle met with 300 students in the Ida Noyes Hall theater to announce that further sit-ins would be banned and that a committee would be formed to investigate CORE's charges of racial discrimination in University-owned buildings.

See also
 Free Speech Movement

References

1962 in Illinois
January 1962 events in the United States
February 1962 events in the United States
1960s in Chicago
Bernie Sanders
Civil disobedience
Civil rights protests in the United States
History of African-American civil rights
University of Chicago
1962 protests